Umawera is a community in Northland, New Zealand. State Highway 1 runs through the community. Mangamuka Bridge is to the northwest, and Rangiahua is to the east. Umawera is part of the Omahuta Forest-Horeke statistical area, which covers the upper Hokianga Harbour. For demographics of this area, see Horeke.

Education
Umawera School is a coeducational contributing primary (years 1–6) school with a roll of  students as of

Notes

Far North District
Populated places in the Northland Region